Monte Poggiolo is a hill near Forlì, Italy in the Emilia-Romagna area. The hill overlooks the Montone River valley from an elevation
of 212 m.

At Monte Poggiolo is a Florentine castle.
The fort was designed by Giuliano da Maiano and built in 1471 in the form of a rhombus with four towers.

Thousands of Paleolithic-era artifacts have been recovered from the nearby area of Ca’ Belvedere (for Casa Belvedere) and dated to around 850,000 years before the present, making them the oldest evidence of human habitation in Italy.

References

External sources
Ca' Belvedere di Monte Poggiolo (Castle Belvedere of Mount Poggiolo)– English 
Castle pictures – Italian text

Forts in Italy
Archaeological sites in Emilia-Romagna
Stone Age Europe